Archives of Microbiology (formerly Archiv für Mikrobiologie ) is a peer-reviewed  scientific journal of microbiology established in 1930. It is edited by Erko Stackebrandt, and published by Springer Berlin Heidelberg ten times per year.

Abstracting and indexing
According to the Journal Citation Reports, the journal has a 2021 impact factor of 2.667. The journal is abstracted and indexing in the following databases:

References

External links
 

Microbiology journals
English-language journals
Publications established in 1930
Springer Science+Business Media academic journals
Hybrid open access journals